Chaw Kam Foon is a Malaysian politician from DAP. He is the Member of Perak State Legislative Assembly for Menglembu after winning the 2018 Malaysian General Election. He is the Assistant of Organization Secretary in DAP Perak and Chief of the Youth Wing. He got his Diploma in Computer Engineering from Singapore.

Election results

References

External links 

Living people
Democratic Action Party (Malaysia) politicians
Malaysian people of Chinese descent
Year of birth missing (living people)